Ryan Kersten (born 21 April 1986 in Adelaide, Australia) is a basketball player, and is currently a point guard for the Adelaide 36ers in the Australian NBL.

Kersten attended the Australian Institute of Sport (AIS). In 2004, he averaged 8.5 points per game, while in 2005, he averaged 10.2.

In 2005-06, Kersten attended college at the University of New Mexico in America, averaging 4.7 points per game and 1.6 assists per game, starting in 15 matches. He established a career high of 16 points while playing against UT-Arlington. He was later named to the 2005 Comcast Lobo Invitational All-Tournament team.

External links
 Kersten's New Mexico player profile
 Kersten's Australian NBL profile

1986 births
Australian men's basketball players
Living people
New Mexico Lobos men's basketball players
New Zealand Breakers players
Point guards
Australian Institute of Sport basketball players
Australian expatriate basketball people in the United States